Shahritus District or Nohiya-i Shahritus is a district in Khatlon Region, southwestern Tajikistan. Its capital is the town Shahrituz. The population of the district is 130,000 (January 2020 estimate).

Administrative divisions
They are as follows:

References

Districts of Khatlon Region
Districts of Tajikistan